Clark Sherwood Dennis (born February 14, 1966) is an American professional golfer. He played on the PGA Tour and Nationwide Tour from 1990 to 2000. He had one win on the Nationwide Tour and a best finish of tied for third place on the PGA Tour. He was tied for sixth in the 1994 U.S. Open. He qualified for the 2017 European Senior Tour where he had two tournament wins and won the John Jacobs Trophy as the leader of the Order of Merit.

Amateur career
Dennis played college golf at the University of Arkansas and Southern Methodist University. He turned professional in 1986.

Professional career
Dennis played on both the PGA Tour (1990–91, 1994–95, 1998–99) and Nationwide Tour (1993, 1996–97, 2000). His best finishes on the PGA Tour were a pair of T-3, at the 1990 Hawaiian Open and at the 1998 Kemper Open. His best finish on the Nationwide Tour was a win at the 1993 Nike Bakersfield Open. His best finish in a major was at the 1994 U.S. Open.

Dennis finished in a tie for second place in the 2017 European Senior Tour qualifying school to gain his place on the tour. Dennis played in the 2017 U.S. Senior Open and the 2017 Senior Open Championship. In September 2017 he had his first success on the European Senior Tour, winning the Senior Italian Open. The final round was abandoned because of a waterlogged course. Dennis and Peter Fowler were tied after two rounds and a playoff was arranged on the 18th hole, played as a par three from the fairway. Dennis won at the first playoff hole with a birdie. The following month he won the Dutch Senior Masters, his second win on the tour. He had six other top-5 finishes during the season and won the John Jacobs Trophy as the leader of the Order of Merit.

In June 2018 he retained the Senior Italian Open. Rafael Gómez led by two strokes with one hole to play but bogeyed the final hole while Dennis made a birdie. Dennis then won at the first playoff hole after Gómez made another bogey. He had his second win of the season in December at the MCB Tour Championship – Mauritius where he was 23-under-par for the three rounds, winning by eight strokes.

Professional wins (8)

Nike Tour wins (1)

Nike Tour playoff record (1–0)

Other wins (2)
1988 Nevada State Open
1992 Texas State Open

European Senior Tour wins (5)

*Note: The 2017 Senior Italian Open was shortened to 36 holes due to rain.

European Senior Tour playoff record (2–1)

Results in major championships

Note: Dennis never played The Open Championship.

CUT = missed the half way cut
"T" indicates a tie for a place.

Results in senior major championships

CUT = missed the halfway cut
"T" indicates a tie for a place
NT = No tournament due to COVID-19 pandemic

See also
1989 PGA Tour Qualifying School graduates
1990 PGA Tour Qualifying School graduates
1993 PGA Tour Qualifying School graduates
1997 PGA Tour Qualifying School graduates

References

External links

American male golfers
Arkansas Razorbacks men's golfers
SMU Mustangs men's golfers
PGA Tour golfers
European Senior Tour golfers
PGA Tour Champions golfers
Golfers from Texas
Sportspeople from Fort Worth, Texas
1966 births
Living people